Stephen Lodge may refer to:

Stephen Lodge (screenwriter) (1943–2017), American screenwriter and actor
Stephen Lodge (referee) (born 1952), retired English football official